This list details chief ministers of Indian states and union territories who have served for the longest years consecutively or otherwise. This list includes chief ministers who have served for more than 10 years in office.

Key
  Incumbent Chief Minister

See also 
 List of current Indian chief ministers
 List of current Indian deputy chief ministers
 List of female chief ministers in India
 List of chief ministers from the Bharatiya Janata Party
 List of chief ministers from the Communist Party of India (Marxist)
 List of chief ministers from the Indian National Congress

Footnotes

References

External links

 
Lists of people by time in office